In mathematics, a ball is the solid figure bounded by a sphere; it is also called a solid sphere. It may be a closed ball (including the boundary points that constitute the sphere) or an open ball (excluding them).

These concepts are defined not only in three-dimensional Euclidean space but also for lower and higher dimensions, and for metric spaces in general. A ball in  dimensions is called a hyperball or -ball and is bounded by a hypersphere or -sphere. Thus, for example, a ball in the Euclidean plane is the same thing as a disk, the area bounded by a circle. In Euclidean 3-space, a ball is taken to be the volume bounded by a 2-dimensional sphere. In a one-dimensional space, a ball is a line segment.

In other contexts, such as in Euclidean geometry and informal use, sphere is sometimes used to mean ball.

In Euclidean space

In Euclidean -space, every ball is bounded by a hypersphere.  The ball is a bounded interval when , is a disk bounded by a circle when , and is bounded by a sphere when .

Volume 

The -dimensional volume of a Euclidean ball of radius  in -dimensional Euclidean space is:

where  is Leonhard Euler's gamma function (which can be thought of as an extension of the factorial function to fractional arguments). Using explicit formulas for particular values of the gamma function at the integers and half integers gives formulas for the volume of a Euclidean ball that do not require an evaluation of the gamma function. These are:

In general metric spaces
Let  be a metric space, namely a set  with a metric (distance function) .

Note in particular that a ball (open or closed) always includes  itself, since the definition requires .

A unit ball (open or closed) is a ball of radius 1.

A subset of a metric space is bounded if it is contained in some ball. A set is totally bounded if, given any positive radius, it is covered by finitely many balls of that radius.

The open balls of a metric space can serve as a base, giving this space a topology, the open sets of which are all possible unions of open balls. This topology on a metric space is called the topology induced by the metric .

Let  denote the closure of the open ball  in this topology. While it is always the case that , it is  always the case that .

In normed vector spaces

The Euclidean balls discussed earlier are an example of balls in a normed vector space.

-norm
In a Cartesian space  with the -norm , that is

an open ball around the origin with radius  is given by the set

For , in a 2-dimensional plane , "balls" according to the -norm (often called the taxicab or Manhattan metric) are bounded by squares with their diagonals parallel to the coordinate axes; those according to the -norm, also called the Chebyshev metric, have squares with their sides parallel to the coordinate axes as their boundaries.

Obviously,  generates the inner of usual spheres.

General convex norm
Note this theorem does not hold if "open" subset is replaced by "closed" subset, because the origin point qualifies but does not define a norm on .

In topological spaces

One may talk about balls in any topological space , not necessarily induced by a metric. Topological -balls are important in combinatorial topology, as the building blocks of cell complexes.

Any open topological -ball is homeomorphic to the Cartesian space  and to the open unit -cube (hypercube) . Any closed topological -ball is homeomorphic to the closed -cube .

An -ball is homeomorphic to an -ball if and only if . The homeomorphisms between an open -ball  and  can be classified in two classes, that can be identified with the two possible topological orientations of .

A topological -ball need not be smooth; if it is smooth, it need not be diffeomorphic to a Euclidean -ball.

Regions

A number of special regions can be defined for a ball:
cap, bounded by one plane
sector, bounded by a conical boundary with apex at the center of the sphere
segment, bounded by a pair of parallel planes
shell, bounded by two concentric spheres of differing radii
wedge, bounded by two planes passing through a sphere center and the surface of the sphere

See also

Ball – ordinary meaning
Disk (mathematics)
Formal ball, an extension to negative radii
Neighbourhood (mathematics)
Sphere, a similar geometric shape
3-sphere
-sphere, or hypersphere
Alexander horned sphere
Manifold
Volume of an -ball
Octahedron – a 3-ball in the  metric.

References

 
 
 

Balls
Metric geometry
Spheres
Topology